As of 2021, the Parliament of Trinidad and Tobago has 41 parliamentary constituencies across the constituent islands, each electing a single Member of Parliament (MP) to the House of Representatives by the plurality (first past the post) system of election, ordinarily every five years. Voting last took place in all 41 of those constituencies at the Trinidad and Tobago general election on 7 September 2015, and these results have been counted and verified.

The number of seats rose from 36 at the 2007 general election after proposals made by the Elections and Boundary Commission were adopted through statutory instruments. Constituencies in Tobago remained unchanged.

Parliamentary constituencies 
The current number of polling stations and electors are listed below based on the data for the 2020 Trinidad and Tobago general election:

See also 

 Lists of electoral districts by nation

References 

 
Constituencies
Trinidad and Tobago
Trinidad and Tobago politics-related lists